Nolan Gould (born October 28, 1998) is an American actor. He is known for his role as Luke Dunphy on the ABC sitcom Modern Family.

Early life and education 
Gould was born in New York City, the son of Angela and Edwin Gould. Shortly after his birth, due to his father's military career, he and his parents moved to Phenix City, Alabama. When Gould was five years old, the family moved to California. His older brother, Aidan Gould, is also an actor.

Gould is a member of Mensa, and, as of 2012, had accelerated four grades in school. He stated on The Ellen DeGeneres Show that he has an IQ of 150. During summer 2012, at age 13, Gould took a General Educational Development (GED) test and said he hoped to take online college courses.

Career 
Gould began his career at age three doing commercials. His recent films include the lead in the feature Ghoul, based on the novel by Brian Keene.

As of the 2014–15 TV season, Gould made over US$70,000 per episode for his role on Modern Family. His other television credits include Eleventh Hour and the movie of the week, Sweet Nothing in My Ear.

In 2017, Gould was featured in the music video for Logic's hit song, "1-800-273-8255," the number for the National Suicide Prevention Lifeline.

Filmography

Film

Television

Music videos

References

External links 

 

1998 births
21st-century American male actors
Male actors from Georgia (U.S. state)
American male child actors
American male film actors
Male actors from New York City
American male television actors
Living people
Mensans
Actors from Columbus, Georgia